Pseudatemelia synchrozella is a moth of the family Oecophoridae. It was described by Jäckh in 1959. It is found in France, Germany, Switzerland, Liechtenstein, Austria, Slovakia, Slovenia and Italy.

References

Moths described in 1959
Amphisbatinae
Moths of Europe